The 2019–20 season of Clube Desportivo Primeiro de Agosto is the club's 42nd season in the Girabola, the Angolan Premier football League and 42nd consecutive season in the top flight of Angolan football. In 2019–20,  the club is participating in the Super Cup, Girabola, the Angola Cup and the 2019–20 CAF Champions League.

On April 30th 2020, in a meeting with the representatives of the 2019–20 season girabola clubs, the Angolan Football Federation decided to cancel the 2019-20 Girabola season due to the coronavirus pandemic.

Squad information

First team

Out on loan

Staff

Pre-season transfers

Mid-season transfers

Overview

Angola Super Cup

First leg

Second leg

Angolan League

League table

Match details

Results

Results by round

Results summary

CAF Champions League

Group stage

First round

Preliminary round

Results summary

Angola Cup

Round of 16

Quarter-finals

Semi-finals

Statistics

Appearances

Scorers

Clean sheets

Disciplinary record

Season progress

See also
 List of C.D. Primeiro de Agosto players

External links
 Official website
 Facebook profile
 Zerozero.pt profile
 Match schedule

References

C.D. Primeiro de Agosto seasons
Primeiro de Agosto